Khirbat al-'Umur was a Palestinian Arab village in the Jerusalem Subdistrict. It was depopulated during the 1948 Palestine war by the Har'el Brigade during Operation Ha-Har. It was 12 km west of Jerusalem on the Wadi al-Ghadir.

History
An  Ottoman village list from about 1870 showed that   chirbet el-'amur had  a population of 69, with a total of  13  houses, though the population count included men, only.

In 1883, the PEF's Survey of Western Palestine (SWP)  described El Ammur as "A small hamlet on the slope above a deep valley. There is a fine perennial spring below on the south ('Ain Mahtush). There are olives beneath the village."

British Mandate era
In the 1922 census of Palestine conducted by the British Mandate authorities,  Kherbet al-'Amur had a population of 137 Muslims, increasing in the 1931 census to 187 Muslims, in 45  houses.

In the 1945 statistics, the village had a population of 270 Muslims,  while the total land area was 4,163   dunams, according to an official land and population survey.  Of this,  497 dunams  were used  for plantations and irrigable land,  1,279  for cereals, while 10  dunams were classified as built-up areas.

1948, aftermath
Khirbat al-'Umur became depopulated on October 21, 1948, after military assault by Yishuv forces.

In 1950, Giv'at Ye'arim was founded on village land.

In 1992, the village site was described: "Stone rubble and window and door frames, partly hidden by wild grass, are scattered across the village site. Many stone terraces are visible. Cactuses grow on the east and north sides of the village site, and almond, olive, fig, and cypress trees grow on the village site itself. The village cemetery, to the south, is covered with dirt and grass but many graves are visible; tombstones stand at the head and foot of each one. The spring of 'Ayn al-'Umur and the stone structure around it can still be seen."

References

Bibliography

External links
Welcome To al-'Umur, Khirbat 
 Khirbat al-'Umur, Zochrot 
Tour of Khirbat al-’Umur, 09/10/2015, Zochrot 
Survey of Western Palestine, Map 17:  IAA, Wikimedia commons 
Al-'Umur, Khirbat, from the Khalil Sakakini Cultural Center

Arab villages depopulated during the 1948 Arab–Israeli War
District of Jerusalem